Chile competed at the 1976 Summer Olympics in Montreal, Quebec, Canada. Seven competitors, all men, took part in eight events in four sports.

Athletics

Men's 10.000 metres
 Edmundo Warnke
 Heat — 28:43.63 (→ did not advance)

Cycling

Two cyclists represented Chile in 1976.

Sprint
 Richard Tormen — 9th place

1000m time trial
 Richard Tormen — 1:09.468 (→ 16th place)

Individual pursuit
 Fernando Vera — 18th place

Fencing

One fencer represented Chile in 1976.

Men's épée
 Juan Inostroza

Shooting

References

External links
Official Olympic Reports

Nations at the 1976 Summer Olympics
1976 Summer Olympics
1976 in Chilean sport